Fatto su misura is a 1985 Italian comedy film directed by Francesco Laudadio.

Cast 
Ricky Tognazzi. Ricky
Lara Wendel: Lisa
Ugo Tognazzi: Professor Nathan
Senta Berger: Miss Schwartz
Antonello Fassari
Rodolfo Laganà
Alessandro Benvenuti
Liliana Eritrei
Silvio Vannucci
Renato Scarpa
Ugo Gregoretti
Paola Tiziana Cruciani

References

External links

1985 films
Italian comedy films
1985 comedy films
Films directed by Francesco Laudadio
1980s Italian films